The Second Serzh Sargsyan government was the governing body of Armenia from 17 April 2018 until 23 April 2018. Serzh Sargsyan was elected by National Assembly and was appointed Prime Minister by President Armen Sarkissian on 17 April 2018.

It was a coalition government formed by two parliamentary groups: the Republicans and Dashnaktsutyun.

The cabinet consisted of eighteen ministries and eight adjunct bodies. Each ministry is responsible for elaborating and implementing governmental decisions in its respective sphere.

Sezh Sargsyan was forced to resign after few days of mass protests within the frames of the 2018 Armenian revolution.

Structure

Governing staff

Ministries

Adjunct bodies 
The role of adjunct bodies is to elaborate, implement and administer governmental decision in respective sphere. Similar to ministries, adjunct bodies are subordinate to Prime Minister. There are eight adjunct bodies to Armenian government.

References 

Politics of Armenia
Political organizations based in Armenia
Government of Armenia
European governments
2018 establishments in Armenia
2018 disestablishments in Armenia
Cabinets established in 2018
Cabinets disestablished in 2018